The following is a timeline of the presidency of Joe Biden during the first quarter of 2021, beginning from his inauguration as the 46th president of the United States on January 20, 2021, to March 31, 2021. To navigate between quarters, see timeline of the Joe Biden presidency. For the Q2 timeline see timeline of the Joe Biden presidency (2021 Q2).

Timeline

January 2021

February 2021

March 2021

See also
 Presidential transition of Joe Biden
 First 100 days of Joe Biden's presidency
 List of executive actions by Joe Biden
 List of presidential trips made by Joe Biden (international trips)
 Timeline of the 2020 United States presidential election

References

2021 Q1
Presidency of Joe Biden
January 2021 events in the United States
February 2021 events in the United States
March 2021 events in the United States
Articles containing video clips
Political timelines of the 2020s by year